The brown dorcopsis (Dorcopsis muelleri), also known as the brown forest wallaby, is a species of marsupial in the family Macropodidae. It is endemic to the lowlands of West New Guinea and the nearby Indonesian islands in West Papua of Misool, Salawati, and Yapen.

Description
Five subspecies of Dorcopsis muelleri are recognised. The dorsal colour is dull brown, chocolate brown, reddish brown or fawn and the underparts are whitish, creamy-yellow or greyish. The arms are sometimes paler than the dorsal surface and the tip of the tail is devoid of hair.

Distribution and habitat
The brown dorcopsis is endemic to the western end of New Guinea and the islands to the west of this, Misool and Salawati and possibly also Batanta and Waigeo. Its typical habitat is swampy tropical lowland forest including areas that flood in the rainy season, and it is believed to be tolerant of secondary forest, including abandoned gardens.

Archaeology
Many bones have been found in the deposits on the floor of two caves used by hunters, the result of 26,000 years of human occupation of this area of western New Guinea. 80% of the animal bones belonged to the brown dorcopsis, known locally as "djief", and the occupants of these caves are consequently known as "djief hunters".

Status
The brown dorcopsis has a broad distribution. It is common in the south coastal part of its range but less common in the centre of the Vogelkop Peninsula and overall its population seems to be stable. Much of its range is uninhabited by humans, but it is also present in areas close to human habitation. Its habitat can be affected by logging, especially on Yapen Island, and the clearing of forested land for small-scale agriculture. Although it is hunted for food, it faces no major threats, and therefore the IUCN lists it as being of "Least concern".

References

Macropods
Mammals of Western New Guinea
Mammals described in 1827
Taxonomy articles created by Polbot
Marsupials of New Guinea